Arcterigone is a monotypic genus of dwarf spiders containing the single species, Arcterigone pilifrons. It was first described by K. Y. Eskov & Y. M. Marusik in 1994, and has only been found in Canada, and in Russia.

See also
 List of Linyphiidae species

References

Linyphiidae
Monotypic Araneomorphae genera
Spiders of North America
Spiders of Russia